Robert Sklyarovich Tedeyev (born 23 January 1986) is a former Russian professional football player.

Club career
He made his Russian Football National League debut for FC Oryol on 5 April 2006 in a game against FC Dynamo Bryansk.

External links
 

1986 births
People from Rustavi
Living people
Russian footballers
Association football defenders
FC Spartak Vladikavkaz players
FC Oryol players